The following is a list of the 13 cantons of the Lozère department, in France, following the French canton reorganisation which came into effect in March 2015:

 Bourgs sur Colagne
 La Canourgue
 Le Collet-de-Dèze
 Florac Trois Rivières
 Grandrieu
 Langogne
 Marvejols
 Mende-1
 Mende-2
 Peyre en Aubrac
 Saint-Alban-sur-Limagnole
 Saint-Chély-d'Apcher
 Saint-Étienne-du-Valdonnez

References